GetJet Airlines is an aircraft leasing (ACMI) and chartering company headquartered in Vilnius, Lithuania. Its aircraft fly on behalf of international airlines currently including TUIfly, Transavia, Air Malta, and others. The company also operates chartered flights for tour operator Tez Tour in the Baltic countries.

History 
The Civil Aviation Administration of the Republic of Lithuania (CAA) issued an Air Operator Certificate (AOC) to GetJet Airlines in March 2016. In May of the same year, the company obtained an EU commercial license. Thereafter, it began to provide aircraft lease services. The company's first flight took place on 25 May 2016.

On 7 February 2018, GetJet Airlines announced that it had successfully passed the International Air Transport Association (IATA) Operational Safety Audit (IOSA). In late 2018 the company took over Small Planet Airlines's chartered flights from the Vilnius airport and began to provide services for tour operators in the Baltic countries.

In September 2019 the company signed an agreement with Sunwing Airlines, a company in Canada, and began to operate flights in that country. In October 2019 GetJet Airlines was the first Lithuanian air carrier to start operating transatlantic flights to North America with an airplane registered in the Baltic country. It operated long-haul flights between Warsaw and Toronto on behalf of LOT Polish Airlines using the only wide-body Airbus A330 aircraft in the Baltic region. In 2019 the company served 1.5 million passengers.

In 2022, GetJet leased three Boeing 737-800 aircraft from World Star Aviation, two of the aircraft were ex-Tigerair Australia and one ex-Virgin Australia. All three were quickly placed into service without a new livery applied, showing signs of their former operators.

Fleet 

As of May 2022, the GetJet Airlines fleet consists of the following aircraft:

References

External links

Airlines of Lithuania
Airlines established in 2016
Charter airlines
Lithuanian companies established in 2016